Federico Duchich (born 19 July 1993) is an Italian lightweight rower. He won 23 Italian championships, two gold medals at the World Coastal Rowing Championships and he won a gold medal at the 2017 World Rowing Championships in Sarasota with the lightweight men's four.

References

1993 births
Living people
Italian male rowers
World Rowing Championships medalists for Italy